Vasco Daniel Ribeiro Cruz (born 11 August 1994 in Fafe) is a Portuguese footballer who plays for AR São Martinho as a defender.

Club career
On 31 July 2016, Cruz made his professional debut with Fafe in a 2016–17 Taça da Liga match against Vizela.

References

External links

Stats and profile at LPFP 

1994 births
Living people
People from Fafe
Portuguese footballers
Association football defenders
Liga Portugal 2 players
Segunda Divisão players
AD Fafe players
Varzim S.C. players
Merelinense F.C. players
A.R. São Martinho players
Pevidém S.C. players
Sportspeople from Braga District